Gotthilf Hempel (born  March 8, 1929) is a retired German marine biologist and oceanographer.

Hempel studied biology and geology at the universities of Mainz and Heidelberg. In 1952 he gained his Ph.D. with a study on the energetics of grasshopper jumps from Heidelberg University. He then went on to work as a scientific assistant at various research institutes in Wilhelmshaven, Helgoland, and Hamburg, where he habilitated with a thesis on the ecology of fry in 1963. Four years later, he became a professor at the University of Kiel at the Institute of Marine Sciences (Institut für Meereskunde Kiel), where he remained director of the Department of Fisheries Biology for the next 14 years and served as Acting Director of the institute from 1972 to 1976. In 1981, he helped found the Alfred Wegener Institute for Polar and Marine Research in Bremerhaven whereupon he became the institution's first director. In the same year, he also became director of the Institute for Polar Ecology at the University of Kiel. In Bremerhaven, he initiated the construction of the polar research vessel PFS Polarstern. In 1992, he became the first director of the then newly founded Center for Marine Tropical Ecology at the University of Bremen. Hempel retired in 1994.

He has been interested and active in research politics throughout his career. From 1963 to 1967 he worked for UNESCO and the FAO and from 1990 to 1996 he was a member of the Wissenschaftsrat, the scientific advisory committee of Germany. He has been and is an active proponent of scientific collaboration and education initiatives in underdeveloped countries, and has advocated a more sustainable exploitation of natural resources. Hempel is the editor of the journal Polar Biology, and he has also published several books. He has had more than 70 doctoral candidates, notably Daniel Pauly. From his time spent researching oceanological topics he has managed to spend over 1000 days aboard research vessels.

He became a foreign member of the Royal Netherlands Academy of Arts and Sciences in 1989. He was awarded the German Order of Merit (Grosses Verdienstkreuz) in 1993.

References 

 Press release of University of Heidelberg about a speech given by Gotthilf Hempel in 2002.
 Laudatio on Gotthilf Hempel (Dr. h.c. of the University of Oldenburg).
 Laudatio, op. cit.

Selected publications 

Early Life History of Marine Fish: The Egg Stage; University of Washington Press; 1980; .
Antarctic Science: Global Concerns; Springer 1994; .
Nachhaltigkeit und globaler Wandel: guter Rat ist Teuer; Peter Lang Publishing, Frankfurt 2003; . (Ed.)

External links 
Curriculum Vitae.
Institute of Polar Ecology in Kiel.
Center for Marine Tropical Ecology in Bremen.

1929 births
Living people
German marine biologists
Fisheries scientists
Commanders Crosses of the Order of Merit of the Federal Republic of Germany
German oceanographers
Members of the Royal Netherlands Academy of Arts and Sciences
Scientists from Göttingen
People from the Province of Hanover
Johannes Gutenberg University Mainz alumni
Heidelberg University alumni
Academic staff of the University of Kiel
Academic staff of the University of Bremen
20th-century German zoologists